The 1994 Cupa României Final was the 56th final of Romania's most prestigious cup competition. The final was played at the Stadionul Regie in Bucharest on 30 April 1994 and was contested between Divizia A sides Gloria Bistriţa and Universitatea Craiova. The cup was won by Gloria Bistriţa.

Route to the final

Match details

References

External links
 Official site 

Cupa Romaniei Final, 1994
Cupa României Finals
CS Universitatea Craiova matches